Jacques Martin (16 April 1952 – 22 June 2004) was a Belgian racing cyclist. He rode in the 1978 Tour de France.

References

1952 births
2004 deaths
Belgian male cyclists
Place of birth missing